The 2022 TCCB Open was a professional tennis tournament played on outdoor clay courts. It was the second edition of the tournament which was part of the 2022 ITF Women's World Tennis Tour. It took place in Collonge-Bellerive, Switzerland between 28 August and 4 September 2022.

Champions

Singles

  Lucrezia Stefanini def.  Sinja Kraus, 6–2, 2–1, ret.

Doubles

  Jenny Dürst /  Weronika Falkowska def.  Michaela Bayerlová /  Jacqueline Cabaj Awad, 7–6(7–5), 6–1

Singles main draw entrants

Seeds

 1 Rankings are as of 22 August 2022.

Other entrants
The following players received wildcards into the singles main draw:
  Karolina Kozakova
  Arlinda Rushiti
  Valentina Ryser
  Sebastianna Scilipoti

The following player received entry into the singles main draw using a protected ranking:
  Emiliana Arango

The following players received entry into the singles main draw as a special exempt:
  Matilde Paoletti
  Zeynep Sönmez

The following players received entry from the qualifying draw:
  Jacqueline Cabaj Awad
  Dia Evtimova
  Oana Gavrilă
  Inès Ibbou
  Anna Klasen
  Dalila Spiteri
  Alice Tubello
  Cody Wong Hong-yi

References

External links
 2022 TCCB Open at ITFtennis.com
 Official website

2022 ITF Women's World Tennis Tour
2022 in Swiss tennis
August 2022 sports events in Switzerland
September 2022 sports events in Switzerland